This is a list of major crimes in the United Kingdom and Crown dependencies that received significant media coverage and/or led to changes in legislation.

Legally each deliberate and unlawful killing of a human being is murder; there is no crime of assassination or serial killing as such, for example.

Child/teenage killings

Individual murders
Murder is the unlawful killing of another person without justification or valid excuse, especially the unlawful killing of another human with malice aforethought.

Serial killings

Sex crimes

Massacres
 Hungerford massacre in 1987: Michael Robert Ryan shoots at multiple bystanders and police officers. 16 people are killed.
 Dunblane massacre in 1996: Thomas Hamilton shoots dead 16 school children and their teacher before turning the gun on himself.
Cumbria shootings in 2010: Taxi man killed 12 people across West Cumbria and shot a further 11 who survived; before killing himself later in the day.
 Plymouth shooting in 2021: 22-year-old Jake Davison fatally shoots five people and injures two others before committing suicide.

See also
 List of heists in the United Kingdom
 List of unsolved murders in the United Kingdom

References

 

Assassinated British people
Organised crime in the United Kingdom

British murder victims
People murdered in the United Kingdom
British police officers
United Kingdom crime-related lists
Major crimes